Sydney Paxton (25 June 1860 in London, England, UK – 13 October 1930 in Montauk, New York, USA) was an English stage and film actor.

Partial filmography

 A Man's Shadow (1920)
 The Bachelor's Club (1921)
 The Rotters (1921)
 Single Life (1921)
 The Old Country (1921)
 The Prince and the Beggarmaid (1921)
 Money (1921)
 The Card (1922)
 The Crimson Circle (1922)
 The Hypocrites (1923)
 Becket (1923)
 Little Miss Nobody (1923)
 The School for Scandal (1923)
 The Audacious Mr. Squire (1923)
 The Fair Maid of Perth (1923)
 Miriam Rozella (1924)
 The Midnight Girl (1925)
 Old Home Week (1925)

References

External links
 

1860 births
1930 deaths
English male stage actors
English male film actors
English male silent film actors
20th-century English male actors
20th-century British male actors
Male actors from London
British emigrants to the United States